On November 2, 2004, an election was held in Portland, Oregon, to elect the mayor. Tom Potter was elected, defeating Jim Francesconi. Incumbent mayor Vera Katz did not seek a fourth term. 

Portland uses a nonpartisan system for local elections, in which all voters are eligible to participate. All candidates are listed on the ballot without any political-party affiliation. 

All candidates meeting the qualifications competed in a blanket primary election on May18, 2008. As no candidate received an absolute majority, the top two finishers advanced to a runoff in the November 6 general election.

Candidates
 David "The Ack" Ackerman, photographer and The Oregonian mailer
 R. Jerry Adams, executive director
 Lori Balkema, U.S. Bank floor coordinator
 Michael Benkoski, journalist
 Phil Busse, writer
 Scot "Extremo the Clown" Campbell, artist and entertainer
 Jim Francesconi, Portland city commissioner
 Craig Gier, engineer
 Bart Hanson, independent contractor
 Robert Ted Hinds, market research analyst
 Bruce W. Hollen, small business owner
 Lew Humble, retired mechanic
 Scott Ketchum, truck driver
 Rosalinda S. Mitchell, writer
 Peter Nilsson, maintenance and research coordinator
 Donald J. Pfau, retired efficiency analyst
 James L. Posey, business owner
 Tom Potter, consultant
 Jeffrey C. Rempfer, advertising and public-relations executive
 Rozz Rezabek-Wright, artist, writer, and construction worker
 Jim Spagnola, retired Social Security worker and former public-access-show host
 Brad Taylor, homeless outreach coordinator
 Jeff R. Taylor, broker and property developer

Primary election results

General election results

References

Mayoral election 2004
2004
2004 Oregon elections
Portland